Herbert Richardson may refer to:

 Herbert Richardson (rower) (1903–1982), Canadian rower
 Herbert Richardson (RAF officer) (1898–1922), World War I flying ace
 Herbert Richardson (publisher) (born 1932), American publisher
 Herbert A. Richardson, timber baron, shipping magnate, and pioneer of Sonoma County, California

See also
Bert Richardson (disambiguation)